Calceolaria crenatiflora is a species of flowering plant in the pocketbook plant genus Calceolaria, family Calceolariaceae. It is native to central and southern Chile and southern Argentina. It has gained the Royal Horticultural Society's Award of Garden Merit as a warm temperate greenhouse ornamental. Along with Calceolaria corymbosa and Calceolaria cana it has contributed to the Calceolaria Herbeohybrida Group of cultivars.

References

crenatiflora
Flora of central Chile
Flora of southern Chile
Flora of South Argentina
Plants described in 1799
Taxa named by Antonio José Cavanilles